Radzanów  is a village in Białobrzegi County, Masovian Voivodeship, in east-central Poland. It is the seat of the gmina (administrative district) called Gmina Radzanów.

The physicist Jan Stefan Ligenza Kurdwanowski, member of the Prussian Academy of Sciences, military officer and contributor to the Encyclopédie, was born in the village

The village has a population of 356.

References

Villages in Białobrzegi County